Mandavi is the eldest daughter of King Kushadhvaja and Queen Chandrabhaga in the Hindu epic Ramayana. She is the wife of Bharata, a younger brother of Rama.

Legend 
Princess Mandavi has a younger sister, Shrutakirti. Mandavi is married to King Dasharatha's second son, Bharata. They have two sons, Taksha and Pushkala.

She used to take care of her in-laws, along with her sister Shrutakirti, when her cousin Sita, when her brothers-in-law Rama and Lakshmana were exiled, and Urmila slept in the place of her husband.

References

Solar dynasty
Characters in the Ramayana